Biraqavand (also Romanized as Bīrāqavand; also known as Bīdāghvand and Bīrqavand) is a village in Qalkhani Rural District, Gahvareh District, Dalahu County, Kermanshah Province, Iran. At the 2006 census, its population was 536, in 120 families.

References 

Populated places in Dalahu County